Coast FM may refer to:
Heart North Wales Coast, commercial radio station in North Wales
Coast FM (Adelaide), a community radio station in Glandore, South Australia
Coast FM (Mandurah), commercial radio station in Mandurah, Western Australia
Coast FM Tasmania, community radio station in Tasmania, Australia
Coast FM (Tenerife), radio station in Tenerife, Canary Islands
Coast FM (Warrnambool), Australian radio station operating out of Warrnambool, servicing the Great South Coast region of Victoria
Coast FM (West Cornwall), community radio station in Cornwall, UK
Coast FM (Westport), community radio station in Westport, New Zealand
East Coast FM, Irish local radio station broadcasting from Bray
91.7 ABC Coast FM, ABC Local Radio station in Australia
90.3 ABC Coast FM, ABC Local Radio station based in Maroochydore
Sedgemoor Coast FM, trial radio station which broadcast to Bridgwater, Somerset, England in 1998 and 1999
WSNE-FM (93.3 FM, "Coast 93-3"), southern New England Hot Adult Contemporary music formatted radio station
WRWN (107.9 "The Coast"), a soft adult contemporary radio station owned by Triad Broadcasting at Port Royal, South Carolina
WGCM-FM (102.3 FM, "Coast 102.3 FM"), classic hits formatted radio station based in Gulfport–Biloxi, Mississippi
WNCV (93.3 FM, "Coast 93.3"), radio station licensed to serve Evergreen, Alabama
KOZT (95.3 FM "The Coast"), radio station broadcasting Album Oriented Rock format, licensed to Ft. Bragg, California
WMNX (97.3 FM "Coast 97.3"), Mainstream Urban radio station licensed to Wilmington, North Carolina

See also
KOST (103.5 FM), radio station in Los Angeles, California